Mark Kyle (born 5 June 1973) is an Irish Olympic eventing rider. Representing Ireland, he competed at three Summer Olympics (in 2004, 2012 and 2016). He placed 5th in team eventing in 2012. Meanwhile, his current best individual Olympic placement is 21st place from the same Games.

Kyle also competed at two editions World Equestrian Games (in 1998 and 2010) and four editions of European Eventing Championships (in 1997, 2003, 2005 and 2011). He is a three-time European youth level team bronze Medallist in equestrian evening. As of 2016, Kyle's best individual championship result is 17th place from the 2003 European Championships in Punchestown, Ireland.

Four-star results

References

1973 births
Living people
Irish male equestrians
Olympic equestrians of Ireland
Equestrians at the 2004 Summer Olympics
Equestrians at the 2012 Summer Olympics
Equestrians at the 2016 Summer Olympics